The 2015–16 Copa Federación de España was the 23rd edition of the Copa Federación de España, also known as Copa RFEF, a knockout competition for Spanish football clubs in Segunda División B and Tercera División. At. Baleares defeated Rayo Majadahonda 3–2 on aggregate in the final.

The champion won the trophy, a cash prize of €90,152 and the qualification for the next year tournament. The runner-up received a cash prize of €30,051 and every semifinalist €12,020. Additionally, each winner of autonomous community tournament received €3,005.

The competition started 29 July 2015 with Asturias tournament and finished 13 April 2016 with the final of national phase.

Autonomous Communities tournaments

West Andalusia and Ceuta tournament

Final

East Andalusia and Melilla tournament

Final

Aragon tournament

Quarter-finals

Semifinals

Final

Asturias tournament

Qualifying tournament

Group A

Group B

Group C

Group D

Semifinals

Final

Neutral venue

Balearic Islands tournament

First round

Peña Deportiva and Mercadal received a bye.

Semifinals

Final

Basque Country tournament

First round

Aurrerá received a bye.

Semifinals

Final

Canary Islands tournament

Semifinal

Tenerife B received a bye.

Final

Cantabria tournament

Quarter-finals

All matches in Stadium Fernando Astobiza of Cayón

Semifinals

All matches in Stadium Fernando Astobiza of Cayón

Final

Neutral venue

Castile and León tournament

Qualifying tournament

Castile-La Mancha tournament

Semifinal

Quintanar del Rey received a bye.

Final

Catalonia tournament

Semifinals

Final

Extremadura tournament

First round

Second round

Semifinals

Final

Galicia tournament

Quarter-finals

Coruxo and  received a bye.

Semifinals

Final

Neutral venue

La Rioja tournament

Quarter-finals

Semifinals

Final

Madrid tournament

Qualifying tournament

Murcia tournament

First round

Semifinals

Final

Neutral venue

Navarre tournament

Qualifying tournament
Group A

Group B

Group C

Semifinals

Final

 Neutral venue

Valencian Community tournament

First round

Elche Ilicitano, Ontinyent and Torre Levante received a bye.

Semifinals

Final

National phase
National phase began 2 December 2015.

-(3) Team playing in 2015–16 Segunda División B (third level in Spanish football)

-(4) Team playing in 2015–16 Tercera División (fourth level in Spanish football)

-(DNP) Team renounced to play

Qualified teams

Defending champion
 Real Unión (3)

Teams losing Copa del Rey first round
 Compostela (3)
 Pontevedra (3)
 Condal (4)
 Racing Santander (3) (DNP)
 Portugalete (3) (DNP)
 Ascó (4)
 Sabadell (3)
 Alcoyano (3) (DNP)
 Hércules (3) (DNP)
 Rayo Majadahonda (3)
 Melilla (3) (DNP)
 Recreativo (3) (DNP)
 Jumilla (3)
 Murcia (3) (DNP)
 Mérida (3)
 Varea (4) (DNP)
 Guadalajara (3)

Winners of Autonomous Communities tournaments
 Sariñena (4)
 Gimnástica Torrelavega (4)
 SD Logroñés (4)
 Badajoz (4)
 Valle Egüés (4)
 Granada B (3)
 Lebrijana (4)
 Ciudad Rodrigo (4)
 Quintanar del Rey (4)
 At. Baleares (3)
 Marino (4)
 Badalona (3)
 Rápido de Bouzas (4)
 Alavés B (4)
 Villa Santa Brígida (4)
 Lorca (4)
 Móstoles (4)
 Elche Ilicitano (4)

Round of 32
The draw for the first round was held on November 3. Round of 32 was played between 2 and 17 December 2015.

 Condal (4),  SD Logroñés (4),  Villa Santa Brígida (4) and  Lorca (4) received a bye.

First leg

Second leg

Pontevedra won 2–0 on aggregate

Gimnástica Torrelavega won 1–1 on away goals rule

Rápido de Bouzas won 3–1 on aggregate after extra time

Rayo Majadahonda won 2–1 on aggregate

Guadalajara won 2–1 on aggregate

Móstoles won 9–1 on aggregate

Elche Ilicitano won 3–3 on away goals rule

At. Baleares won 1–0 on aggregate after extra time

Sariñena won 3–1 on aggregate after extra time

Mérida won 4–1 on aggregate

Badajoz won 5–3 on aggregate

Quintanar del Rey won 1–0 on aggregate

Round of 16
The draw for the Round of 16 was held on December 18. This round was played between 6 and 21 January 2016.

First leg

Second leg

Rápido de Bouzas won 3–3 on aggregate on away goals rule

Mérida won 8–2 on aggregate

Gimnástica Torrelavega won 5–3 on aggregate

Sariñena won 4–2 on aggregate

At. Baleares won 7–1 on aggregate

Elche Ilicitano won 2–1 on aggregate

Móstoles won 3–2 on aggregate

Rayo Majadahonda won 3–1 on aggregate

Quarter-finals
The draw was held 22 January. Quarter-finals round was played between 3 and 10 February 2016.

First leg

Second leg

Rayo Majadahonda won 4–1 on aggregate

Mérida won 4–1 on aggregate

At. Baleares won 3–3 on aggregate on away goals rule

Gimnástica won 4–2 on aggregate

Semi-finals
The draw was held 12 February. Semi-finals were played between 3 and 16 March 2016.

First leg

Second leg

Rayo Majadahonda won 4–1 on aggregate

At. Baleares won 3–2 on aggregate

Final
Final was played between 6 and 13 April 2016.

First leg

Second leg

At. Baleares won 3–2 on aggregate

2015-16
3
2015–16 Segunda División B
2015–16 Tercera División